Taylor Carpet Company Building is a historic commercial building located at Indianapolis, Indiana.  It was built in 1897, and is a seven-story, rectangular, Beaux-Arts style building. The top three stories were added in 1906. The front facade is faced with buff terra cotta and the upper stories feature large Chicago style window openings. The first two floors are faced with an Art Moderne style stone veneer. It is located next to the Indianapolis News Building. The building housed the Taylor Carpet Company, in operation until 1936.

It was listed on the National Register of Historic Places in 1984.  It is located in the Washington Street-Monument Circle Historic District.

References

Individually listed contributing properties to historic districts on the National Register in Indiana
Commercial buildings on the National Register of Historic Places in Indiana
Beaux-Arts architecture in Indiana
Commercial buildings completed in 1897
Commercial buildings in Indianapolis
National Register of Historic Places in Indianapolis
Chicago school architecture in Indiana